Grace Anderson (born 9 July 1997) is a New Zealand racing cyclist, who most recently rode for UCI Women's Continental Team . She rode in the women's road race event at the 2018 UCI Road World Championships.

References

External links

1997 births
Living people
New Zealand female cyclists
Place of birth missing (living people)
21st-century New Zealand women